Grasscroft is a village in the civil parish of Saddleworth in the Metropolitan Borough of Oldham, in Greater Manchester, England. It is historically part of the West Riding of Yorkshire.

The village has two notable residents - former Manchester United and England footballer Paul Scholes and physicist Brian Cox.

See also

Listed buildings in Saddleworth
Grasscroft Halt railway station

References

Geography of the Metropolitan Borough of Oldham
Saddleworth
Villages in Greater Manchester